Walter Elmore Nance (born 1933) is Professor and Chair (emeritus) of the Department of Human Genetics of the Virginia Commonwealth University.  He is an internationally known expert in hereditary deafness, twin studies and genetic linkage analysis of both continuous and qualitative traits.

Biography 

Nance was born in Manila and spent his childhood in Shanghai, New Orleans, and Oak Ridge, Tennessee.  After receiving his M.D. from Harvard Medical School, Nance was assistant professor of medicine at the Vanderbilt University School of Medicine from 1963 to 1969 and professor of medical genetics and medicine at the Indiana University School of Medicine from 1969 to 1975.  In 1975, Nance accepted a position at the Virginia Commonwealth University where he continues to be active in research.

He and his wife Mayna Avent are retired in Sewanee, Tennessee.

Education 

Nance graduated from the Phillips Exeter Academy in 1950.  He received an S.B. in Mathematics in 1954 from the University of the South, an M.D. in 1958 from Harvard Medical School, and a Ph.D. in Genetics in 1968 from the University of Wisconsin.

External links
 Retirement of Walter Nance from chair at VCU.

1933 births
Living people
Sewanee: The University of the South alumni
Harvard Medical School alumni
University of Wisconsin–Madison alumni
Vanderbilt University faculty
Indiana University faculty
Virginia Commonwealth University faculty
People from Sewanee, Tennessee